Uranium zirconium hydride (UZrH), a combination of uranium hydride and zirconium(II) hydride, is used as the fuel in TRIGA reactors. UZrH fuel is used in most research reactors at universities and has a large, prompt negative fuel temperature coefficient of reactivity, meaning that as the temperature of the core increases, the reactivity rapidly decreases.

Franco-Belge de Fabrication du Combustible, in Romans-sur-Isère, France, is the only manufacturer of this fuel.

References

External links
 Technical Foundations of TRIGA: Thermalization In Zirconium Hydride

TRIGA

Isotope separation
Nuclear fuels
Nuclear materials
Uranium